Camp Huckstep is a large military base in Egypt, bordering Cairo International Airport on the east. The name "Huckstep" was given in 1943 and is still used by Egyptians today. It has an area of approximately 12 by 12 kilometers.

History

During World War II, the camp was used by Allied forces at least as early as 1941. In 1943, the camp was the largest military supply depot in the Middle East, including among other things an 1100-bed hospital and a US-run radio station. At the same time, it functioned as an air base.

When Russell Benjamin Huckstep (a US soldier born in 1906 in Iowa) was killed in a plane crash over North Africa in 1943, the camp was renamed after him

Later, the camp was used by the Egyptian Armed Forces and other Egyptian government bodies. It has been used for many prisoners, including Communists, Muslim Brotherhood members, and others, such as Palestinian writer Mohamed Ali Eltaher.

On September 23, 2021, The base was renamed the Mohamed Hussein Tantawi military base in honor of the late Egyptian commander-in-chief of the Egyptian Armed Forces, in recognition of his achievements.

Currently, the camp houses a recruitment center for soldiers from the greater Cairo region, a prison, and other facilities.

References

World War II sites in Egypt
Internment camps